Andrew Burnham could refer to: 

Andy Burnham (born 1970), British politician
Andrew Burnham (priest) (born 1948), English Roman Catholic priest